The Who's the Man? Soundtrack is the soundtrack to the 1993 film Who's the Man?. The album was released in 1993 on Uptown/MCA Records. The soundtrack peaked at 32 on the Billboard 200 chart in 1993.

Release and reception

The album reached number thirty-two on the U.S. Billboard 200 and reached the eighth spot on the R&B albums chart.

William Ruhlmann of AllMusic gave the soundtrack a lowly two-out-of-five rating, stating that the work is "mediocre, formula rap, in the typically boastful, lustful, mock-angry style, and none of it is memorable."

Track listing

Personnel
Information taken from AllMusic.
arranging – CL Smooth, Kenny "G-Love" Greene, Crystal J. Johnson, Dave Kelly
art direction – Brett Wright
assistant engineering – Mark Stumpy Brown, Todd Childress, Jimela Green, Robin Mays, Vaughn Merrick, Rob Summers, Sikru Shoe Uluoglu, Brian Vibberts
assistant mixing – Scott Canto, Todd Childress, Rich July, John Kogan, Rob Summers
associate production – James Earl Jones, Jr., Tim Dawg
composing – DeVante Swing, Easy Mo Bee, Chad "Dr. Seuss" Elliott, Doug E. Fresh, Randy Fuller, Jimmy Hammond, Bob James, James Earl Jones, Jr., Dave Kelly, the Kay Gees, Kool and the Gang, Kool Chris, Kenny "K-Smoove" Kornegay, Kevin "Big Kev" McDaniels, Michael Moore, Peter Phillips, Erick Sermon, Tim Dog, Jesse West, T. West
coordination – Crystal J. Johnson
drum programming – Erick Sermon
engineering – Charles "Prince Charles" Alexander, Mark Stumpy Brown, Scott Canto, Todd Childress, DJ Lethal, Everlast, Edward "DJ Eddie F" Ferrell, Jimela Green, Rich July, Dave Kelly, John Kogan, Tony Maserati, Robin Mays, Armen Mazlumian, Vaughn Merrick, Katherine Kat Miller, Johnny Most, Chrystin Nevarez, Pete Rock & CL Smooth, Darin Prindle, Jason Roberts, Rob Summers, Tim Dog, Sikru Shoe Uluoglu, Brian Vibberts
executive production – Sean "Puffy" Combs, Andre Harrell, Mark Siegell
lyricist(s) – 3rd Eye, Buju Banton, Big, CL Smooth, Cocheeks, DeVante Swing, Timothy Drayton, Father MC, Kenny "G-Love" Greene, Heavy D, Crystal J. Johnson, James Earl Jones, Jr., Dave Kelly, Erick Sermon
mastering – Jose Rodriquez
mixing – Charles "Prince Charles" Alexander, DJ Lethal, Tim Dawg, Everlast, Dave Kelly, Tony Maserati, Armen Mazlumian, Katherine Kat Miller, Johnny Most, Pete Rock & CL Smooth, Darin Prindle
multi-instruments – 3rd Eye, Buju Banton, Big, Group Home, House of Pain, Jodeci, Crystal J. Johnson, Pete Rock & CL Smooth, Spark 950, Timbo King
music supervision – Toby Emmerich, Kathy Nelson
performer(s) – Buju Banton, Big, Mary J. Blige, Father MC, Heavy D & the Boyz, House of Pain, Jodeci, Crystal J. Johnson, Pete Rock & CL Smooth, Erick Sermon
production – Sean "Puffy" Combs, DeVante Swing, DJ Lethal, D.X.T., Easy Mo Bee, Everlast, Edward "DJ Eddie F" Ferrell, Randy Fuller, Andre Harrell, Crystal J. Johnson, James Earl Jones, Jr., Dave Kelly, Kool Chris, Kenny "K-Smoove" Kornegay, Lord Finesse, Kevin "Big Kev" McDaniels, Darryl Pearson, Pete Rock & CL Smooth, Jason Roberts, Erick Sermon, Mark Siegell, Spark, Tim Dog, Jesse West, T. West, Darin Whittington
rapping – Cocheeks, Father MC, Heavy D, J.Z., Tim Dawg
vocal arranging – Crystal J. Johnson, Dave Kelly, CL Smooth
vocals – 3rd Eye, Buju Banton, Big, Mary J. Blige, Father MC, Group Home, Heavy D, House of Pain, Jodeci, Crystal J. Johnson, Pete Rock & CL Smooth, Erick Sermon, Spark 950, Timbo King

Charts

Weekly charts

Year-end charts

Singles

"—" denotes releases that did not chart.

Notes

External links
 
 Who's the Man? at Discogs

1993 soundtrack albums
Albums produced by Easy Mo Bee
Albums produced by Lord Finesse
Albums produced by Pete Rock
Albums produced by Eddie F
Comedy film soundtracks
Hip hop soundtracks
MCA Records soundtracks
Rhythm and blues soundtracks